The list of ship launches in 1915 includes a chronological list of ships launched in 1915.



References

Sources

 
 
 

 
 
 

1915
 
1915 in transport